Henry Ashley (February 19, 1778 – January 14, 1829) was an American politician and a U.S. Representative from New York from 1825 to 1827.

Biography
Ashley was born the son of David Ashley in Winchester, Cheshire County, New Hampshire. He attended the common schools on December 14, 1817, at Catskill, Greene County, New York. Henry's estate was proved on January 29, 1829, at Catskill, Greene County, New York. They had five children, Henry, George, Clarence, Charles (April 26, 1826 – November 27, 1826), and Charles (born December 19, 1827).

Career
Serving as Town Clerk of Winchester in 1811, Ashley was also a Justice of the Peace in 1817. Afterwards he moved to Catskill and married Susan Haight Van Voorhis there on December 14, 1817. They had five children. He was Chairman of the Catskill Tanners' Association in 1825.

Congress 
Elected as a Jacksonian to the 19th United States Congress, Ashley was Representative for the eleventh district of New York from March 4, 1825, to March 3, 1827.

Later career 
Afterwards he resumed his tanning business, and was President of the Board of Trustees of the Village of Catskill from 1828 until his death.

Death
Ashley died in Catskill, Greene County, New York, on January 14, 1829 (age 50 years, 330 days). He was interred at the Catskill Village Cemetery on Thomson Street.

References

External links

Ashley genealogy at Conover genealogy

1778 births
1829 deaths
People from Winchester, New Hampshire
American people of English descent
Jacksonian members of the United States House of Representatives from New York (state)
People from Catskill, New York
Members of the United States House of Representatives from New York (state)